James Homer Garrott (1897–1991), was an American architect active in the Los Angeles area in the mid-20th century. He designed more than 200 buildings, including twenty-five churches and several public buildings. He has been described as a "pivotal black avant garde modernist of the 1940s era."

Biography 
James Homer Garrott was born on June 19, 1897 in Montgomery, Alabama. Garrott graduated from Los Angeles Polytechnic High School in 1917. He earned his architect's license in 1928. Garrott's first major achievement was as co-designer of the 1928 Golden State Mutual Life Insurance Company. From 1926 to 1928, Garrott worked with Cavagliere Construction Company of Los Angeles. He then studied Architecture at the University of Southern California from 1930 to 1934.

Garrott was a close friend of the eminent civil rights attorney Loren Miller. In early 1940, Garrott designed both of their Silver Lake split-level homes at 647 and 653 Micheltorena Street.

In 1946, Garrott was the second African-American admitted to the American Institute of Architects (AIA) in Los Angeles, after Paul R. Williams. His application was sponsored by Williams and Gregory Ain.

Garrott and Ain shared office space in the Granada Building beginning in 1940. Then they worked together in a "loose partnership" in the 1940s and 50s, and together designed a small office building that they shared in the Silver Lake neighborhood of Los Angeles. They were alternately “Garrott & Ain” or “Ain & Garrott,” depending on who was responsible for design, while on other projects they simply assisted each other's solo work without credit. After World War II, Garrott and Ain together designed and built their architectural office, at 2311 Hyperion Avenue, within walking distance from Garrott's home.

Garrott was “politically well connected” and received nine commissions from the Los Angeles County Government in the late 1950s. Yet the Los Angeles Tribune commented: "James Garrott, Paul R. Williams, and Carey Jenkins, are the only Negro architects ever to get a public contract in this slate ... and except for Williams they get them infrequently."

He died on June 9, 1991 in Los Angeles, California

Buildings 

 1928: (with Louis Blodgett) Golden State Mutual Life Insurance Building, Los Angeles, California
 listed in the National Register of Historic Places in 1998 (#98000712).
 1929: (as Williams, Garrott & Young) St. Philip's Episcopal Church, Los Angeles, California
 City of Los Angeles Historic-Cultural Monument #987
 1936: Mount Zion Baptist Church, Los Angeles, California
 [before 1939]: George A. Beavers, Jr. residence, Los Angeles, California
 1940: Garrott Residence/Loren Miller residence, Los Angeles, California
 1940: Apartment building for Grace F. Marquis, Fifth and New Hampshire streets, Los Angeles, California
 [before 1948]: Dental Building for Dr. George Hurd
 1944: Bethlehem Baptist Church (unbuilt project), Los Angeles, California
 1949: (with Gregory Ain) Ain & Garrott Office, Silver Lake, Los Angeles, California
 1950: Moss Construction Co., Kenter Canyon, California
 1950: (with Gregory Ain) Hamilton Methodist Church (unbuilt)
 1951: (with Gregory Ain) Ben Margolis House, Los Angeles, California
 1952: Friedman residence, Los Angeles, California
 1953: M. Wesley Farr residence, El Segundo, California
 1955: Firestone Sheriff's Station, Florence-Firestone, California
 "considered the most modern law enforcement facility of its time."
 1957: Lawndale Administrative Center, Lawndale, California
 1958-60: (with Gregory Ain) Westchester Municipal Building, Los Angeles, California
David Gebhard described Garrott's design as “an anonymous building.”
 1958-60: (with Gregory Ain) Loyola Village Branch Library, Los Angeles, California
 1959: (with Gregory Ain) Ralph Atkinson residence, Monterey County, California
 1960: Bodger County Park Director's Building, Hawthorne, California
 1960: Del Aire County Park Director's Building, Hawthorne, California
 1963: Victoria Park Pool and Bathhouse, Carson, California
 1970: Carson Public Library, Carson, California

See also 

 African-American architects

References 

African-American architects
Architects from Alabama
Architects from Los Angeles
20th-century American architects
Modernist architects
Modernist architecture in California
1897 births
1991 deaths
20th-century African-American artists